Stradbally GAA is a Gaelic Athletic Association club located in Stradbally County Waterford, Ireland, with teams in both Gaelic Football and Hurling. Players include Waterford county hurling captain, Michael Walsh.

Despite being so successful in the County Senior Football Championship, winning 19 times, Stradbally have never won the Munster Senior Club Championship, being losing finalists twice. Stradbally won 5 Waterford Senior championships in a row between 2001-2005. They won further titles in 2009, 2010, 2012, 2015 & 2017.Despite winning the 2017 Waterford Senior Football Championship, Stradbally did not represent Waterford in the 2017 Munster Senior Club Football Championship due to the county not completing its club championship in time- the county final occurring a week after the provincial final due to the hurling having been prioritised. This meant Waterford had no team in the Munster Championship that year. This was not the first time Stradbally had been negatively affected in terms of participation in the provincial championship, having in 2015 been forced to play their Munster Quarter Final only one day after winning the County Final.

Honours
 Waterford Senior Football Championship: 19
 1940, 1941, 1942, 1943, 1944, 1972, 1980, 1982, 1987, 2001, 2002, 2003, 2004, 2005, 2009, 2010, 2012,2015, 2017 
 Runners-Up: 1936, 1939, 1945, 1961, 1977, 1990, 1991, 1999, 2006, 2011, 2013,2014
 Waterford Junior Football Championship: 5
 1932, 1957, 2006, 2016, 2022. 
 Munster Senior Club Football Championship 
 Runners-Up: 1980, 2004
 Waterford Minor Football Championships: 3
 1937, 1964, 2006
 Waterford Under-21 Football Championship: 2
 1997, 1999
 Waterford Intermediate Hurling Championship: 2
 1993, 1998
 Waterford Junior Hurling Championship: 1
1974

Notable players
 Michael Walsh (All-Star winner in 2007, 2009, 2010 and 2017)

References

External links
Official Stradbally GAA Club website
Hogan Stand

Gaelic games clubs in County Waterford
Hurling clubs in County Waterford
Gaelic football clubs in County Waterford
1908 establishments in Ireland